V is a science fiction franchise created by American writer, producer and director Kenneth Johnson about a genocidal invading alien race known as the "Visitors"—reptilian humanoids disguised as human beings—trying to take over Earth, and the human reaction to this, including the Resistance group attempting to stop them, while others collaborate with the aliens for power and personal wealth.

The two-part television miniseries V aired in 1983, written and directed by Johnson. It had cost US$13 million to produce. It was followed in 1984 by a three-part miniseries, V: The Final Battle, and a nineteen-episode weekly television series, V (sometimes referred to as V: The Series) during the 1984–85 television season. ABC ran a remake series, produced by Warner Bros. Television, which ran for two seasons totalling 22 episodes from November 3, 2009, to March 15, 2011.

In the original series, the title refers to the "V for Victory" sign. In the 1983 V miniseries, a group of children are shown spray painting generic graffiti over the Visitors' propaganda posters, but are then shown how to spray the V over the posters by Abraham Bernstein, a Holocaust survivor, who explains the meaning of the sign to them as he defaces the first poster. In the 2009 reboot of the series, however, V is used within the show as an abbreviation for the Visitors.

A number of novels, comic books, video games and other media have been spun off from the franchise. Johnson's novel V: The Second Generation, an alternative sequel to the first miniseries which disregards V: The Final Battle and V: The Series because of his non-involvement with them, was released on February 5, 2008. Johnson stated he was in negotiations for a TV adaptation of his sequel novel, but Warner Bros. opted to do the 2009 remake series instead.

Television
 V miniseries (1983)
 V: The Final Battle sequel miniseries (1984)
 V weekly series (1984–1985)
 V remake series (2009–2011)

The original miniseries debuted in the United States on NBC on May 1, 1983. Series creator Kenneth Johnson has said that the story was inspired by the 1935 novel It Can't Happen Here by Sinclair Lewis. In a commentary track on the DVD release of the first miniseries, Johnson reveals that V was originally intended as a straightforward political thriller, charting the rise of a fascist movement in the United States. NBC was interested in a sci-fi hit, to capitalize on the success of films such as the Star Wars trilogy.

The miniseries was successful enough to spawn a sequel, V: The Final Battle, which was meant to conclude the story, but this led to a further continuation as a weekly television series in 1984–1985. Johnson left the franchise during production of The Final Battle. The abrupt cancellation of the weekly TV series in the spring of 1985 meant that the series ended with an unresolved cliffhanger. V was remade as a new weekly TV series in 2009.

Film attempts
For many years, Kenneth Johnson tried to resurrect V as another television production. When his attempts failed, and Warner Bros (who own the television rights to the property) opted to remake the series instead, Johnson then tried to develop V as a feature film. However, his various attempts at this also failed to get off the ground.
On February 6, 2018, the reincarnated Desilu Studios announced that it would be producing a feature film of V. The film would be written and directed by Kenneth Johnson, and produced by John Hermansen, Barry Opper, and Johnson. Johnson added "We are delighted to team up with Desilu to bring the timeless—and timely—story of resistance against tyranny into the 21st Century ... V will be the first of a cinematic trilogy which will tell the full epic tale in the manner I always envisioned." Johnson later updated his site to say that Desilu's option has expired, and referred to allegations that the individual helming the new Desilu was defrauding investors. Since then, no further news has surfaced about another V production, either for film or television.

Novels

Original series
V spun off a series of original novels. Five were originally planned but the range soon extended beyond these. The first was a novelization of the first two miniseries combined into one story, originally planned as 2 books, Pinnacle later changed their minds during its writing, and decreed that it should be one book (The publishers were then left with the option of another book, this became East Coast Crisis)  Because the Writers guide was not ready in time for the authors to consult, most of the original novels that followed did not feature characters or continuing storylines from the TV series, but rather focused on battles against the alien invaders in other parts of the world, some were also set during the "unrecorded year" between the end of "The Final Battle" and "Liberation day" to get around this problem.

While the series was on the air, new novels were published once a month by Pinnacle Paperbacks, and in the U.K. every 2 months by New English Library.  In 1987–88, the remaining 5 books, left unpublished with the demise of Pinnacle books, were published by Tor. No U.K. publisher was found for these.

The Second Generation

Kenneth Johnson—V's original creator—had been trying to bring the series back to television as a sequel to the original miniseries that would ignore the second miniseries and all the other subsequent fiction.  When Warner Bros. decided to go with a complete reboot instead, Johnson wrote his story as a new novel.

Factual books
A number of factual books, covering all aspects of the saga including interviews, articles and episode guides, have been published, most notably the 6 volumes of The V Files, written By James Van Hise and Ed Gross, published by New Media Books/Psi Fi movie Press in the mid 1980s, and the two French books, V: l'autre guerre des mondes (V: The Other War of the Worlds) by Francis Valery, first published in paperback in 1993 by DLM editions (and reissued in 1995), covering the entire original saga up to and including, the unfilmed episode #20 "The Attack", and V: les miroirs du passe (V: The Mirrors of the Past), by Didier Liardet, published by Yris Editions in 2011, this paperback features a full episode guide to both the 1980s original and the modern reboot, details the history of the show, and also includes photos of  merchandise from the series over the years.

In 2017, a book by Dan Copp entitled Fascist Lizards from Outer Space: The Politics, Literary Influences and Cultural Impact of Kenneth Johnson's V was published by McFarland & Company.

Also of note is John L. Flynn's Future Threads: Costume Design for the Science Fiction World, published in 1985 by New Media books, which has instructions and patterns for creating several different Visitor costumes, among others.

Comics
DC Comics published an 18-issue V comic book series from February 1985 – July 1986, with stories set to be concurrent with the events of V: The Series.  The editor of the comic reported at one point in the letter (fan mail) column that DC was working to acquire permission to continue the storyline of the television series should it not be renewed for a second season.  In the end, either such permission was denied or DC decided not to pursue the matter further. The cover of the 18th issue did state "Final Issue", but actually featured (with issue 17) a flashback story featuring Elias Taylor. (Issue 16 led into the opening scene of the final television episode.)

In Japan, Go Nagai wrote a manga adaptation of the series with art by Tatsuya Yasuda.

Computer game

V is a video game based on the TV series of the same name. It was developed by Ocean Software. The programmer was Grant Harrison.

In the role of Mike Donovan, the player must infiltrate an alien mother-ship, destroy the craft, and escape alive. The opening scene is a docking bay, and the player's objectives are to spread the red dust to take out the alien visitors and to set 5 bombs in strategic locations to blow up the mother-ship. The player must solve many puzzles in order to progress and complete the game.

References

External links

 
 
 
 
 Kenneth Johnson's Official Site

 
Science fiction franchises
Television franchises
Dystopian fiction